Solidarity is a socialist newspaper published by the Alliance for Workers' Liberty (AWL).

The paper was founded as a monthly in the mid-1990s, as Action for Health and Welfare, by the Welfare State Network (WSN), a campaign supported by the AWL, the International Socialist Group and others.

The paper became identified with the AWL after its name was changed to Action for Solidarity and it went fortnightly. The name was subsequently shortened to Solidarity. It is currently a weekly paper edited by Martin Thomas.

References 

Socialist newspapers published in the United Kingdom
Weekly newspapers published in the United Kingdom
1990s establishments in the United Kingdom
Publications established in the 1990s
Monthly newspapers